"King Cotton" is a slogan that summarized the strategy used before the American Civil War (of 1861–1865) by secessionists in the southern states (the future Confederate States of America) to claim the feasibility of secession and to prove there was no need to fear a war with the northern states. The theory held that control over cotton exports would make a proposed independent Confederacy economically prosperous, would ruin the textile industry of New England, and—most importantly—would force the United Kingdom and perhaps France to support the Confederacy militarily because their industrial economies depended on Southern cotton. The slogan, widely believed throughout the South, helped in mobilizing support for secession: by February 1861, the seven states whose economies were based on cotton plantations had all seceded and formed the Confederacy. Meanwhile, the other eight slave states, with little or no cotton production, remained in the Union.

To demonstrate the alleged power of King Cotton, Southern cotton merchants spontaneously refused to ship out their cotton in early 1861; it was not a government decision. By summer 1861, the Union Navy blockaded every major Confederate port and shut down over 95% of exports. However, the British were able to acquire cotton from alternative sources such as India, Egypt and Brazil. Britain had already abolished slavery, and the public would not have tolerated the government militarily supporting a sovereignty upholding the ideals of slavery.

Consequently, it proved a failure for the Confederacy, as the strategy did not succeed in making the new Confederate polity economically prosperous. The blockade prevented the earning of desperately needed gold. Most importantly, the false belief led to unrealistic assumptions that the war would be won through European intervention if only the Confederacy held out long enough.

History
The American South is known for its long, hot summers, and rich soils in river valleys, making it an ideal location for growing cotton. The many southern seaports and riverside docks allowed shipping cotton to remote destinations. By 1860, Southern plantations supplied 75% of the world's cotton, with shipments from Houston, New Orleans, Charleston, Mobile, Savannah, and a few other ports.

The insatiable European demand for cotton was a result of the Industrial Revolution which created the machinery and factories to process raw cotton into clothing that was better and cheaper than a handmade product. European and New England purchases soared from 720,000 bales in 1830 to 2.85 million bales in 1850, to nearly 5 million in 1860. Cotton production renewed demand for slavery after the tobacco market had declined in the late 18th century.  The more cotton was grown, the more slaves were needed to harvest the crops.  By 1860, on the eve of the American Civil War, cotton accounted for almost 60% of American exports, representing a total value of nearly $200 million a year.

Cotton's central place in the national economy and its international importance led Senator James Henry Hammond of South Carolina to make a famous boast in 1858:

Confederate leaders had made little effort to ascertain the views of European industrialists or diplomats until the Confederacy sent diplomats James Mason and John Slidell in November 1861. That led to a diplomatic blowup in the Trent Affair.

British position

When war broke out, the Confederate people, acting spontaneously without government direction, held their cotton at home, watching prices soar and an economic crisis hit Britain and New England, causing a backlash with British public opinion. Even if Britain did intervene, it would mean war with the United States, as well as loss of the American market, loss of American grain supplies, risk to Canada, and much of the British merchant marine, all in the slim promise of getting more cotton. Besides that, in the spring of 1861, warehouses in Europe were bulging with surplus cotton, which later soared in price. So the cotton interests made their profits without a war. The Union imposed a naval blockade, closing all Confederate ports to normal traffic; consequently, the South was unable to move 95% of its cotton. Yet, some cotton was slipped out by blockade runners, or through Mexico. Cotton diplomacy, advocated by the Confederate diplomats James M. Mason and John Slidell, completely failed because the Confederacy could not deliver its cotton, and the British economy was robust enough to absorb a depression in textiles from 1862–64.

As Union armies moved into cotton regions of the South in 1862, the U.S. acquired all the cotton available, and sent it to Northern textile mills or sold it to Europe. Meanwhile, cotton production increased in British India by 70% and also increased in Egypt. Between 1860 and 1870, Brazilian annual cotton exports rose 400%, from 12,000 to 60,000 tonnes.

Economics
When war broke out, the Confederates refused to allow the export of cotton to Europe. The idea was that this cotton diplomacy would force Europe to intervene.  However, European states did not intervene, and following Abraham Lincoln's decision to impose a Union blockade, the South was unable to market its millions of bales of cotton. The production of cotton increased in other parts of the world, such as India and Egypt, to meet the demand, and new profits in cotton were among the motives of the Russian conquest of Central Asia.  A British-owned newspaper, The Standard of Buenos Aires, in cooperation with the Manchester Cotton Supply Association succeeded in encouraging Argentinian farmers to greatly increase production of cotton in Argentina and export it to the United Kingdom.

Surdam (1998) asks, "Did the world demand for American-grown raw cotton fall during the 1860s, even though total demand for cotton increased?" Previous researchers have asserted that the South faced stagnating or falling demand for its cotton. Surdam's more complete model of the world market for cotton, combined with additional data, shows that the reduction in the supply of American-grown cotton induced by the Civil War distorts previous estimates of the state of demand for cotton. In the absence of the drastic disruption in the supply of American-grown cotton, the world demand for such cotton would have remained strong.

Stanley Lebergott (1983) shows the South blundered during the war because it clung too long to faith in King Cotton. Because the South's long-range goal was a world monopoly of cotton, it devoted valuable land and slave labor to growing cotton instead of urgently needed foodstuffs.

In the end, "King Cotton" proved to be a delusion that misled the Confederacy into a hopeless war that it ended up losing.

See also

 Diplomacy of the American Civil War
 Cotton production in the United States
 Black Belt in the American South
 Origins of the American Civil War

References

Bibliography
 Blumenthal, Henry. "Confederate Diplomacy: Popular Notions and International Realities." Journal of Southern History 1966 32(2): 151-171.  in Jstor
Hubbard, Charles M. The Burden of Confederate Diplomacy (1998)
 Jones, Howard, Union in Peril: The Crisis over British Intervention in the Civil War (1992) online edition
 Lebergott, Stanley. "Why the South Lost: Commercial Purpose in the Confederacy, 1861-1865." Journal of American History 1983 70(1): 58-74.  in Jstor
 Lebergott, Stanley. "Through the Blockade: The Profitability and Extent of Cotton Smuggling, 1861-1865," The Journal of Economic History, Vol. 41, No. 4 (1981), pp. 867–888 in JSTOR
 Owsley, Frank Lawrence. King Cotton Diplomacy: Foreign relations of the Confederate States of America (1931, revised 1959) Continues to be the standard source; online review 
 Frank Lawrence Owsley, "The Confederacy and King Cotton: A Study in Economic Coercion," North Carolina Historical Review 6#4 (1929), pp. 371–397 in JSTOR; summary
Scherer, James a.b. Cotton as a world power: a study in the economic interpretation of history (1916)  online edition
 Surdam, David G. "King Cotton: Monarch or Pretender? The State of the Market for Raw Cotton on the Eve of the American Civil War." Economic History Review 1998 51(1): 113-132. in JSTOR
 Yafa, Stephen H. Big Cotton: How A Humble Fiber Created Fortunes, Wrecked Civilizations, and Put America on the Map (2004)

Further reading

External links
 Cotton King Cartoon
King Cotton

Economic history of the Confederate States of America
History of the Southern United States
Economic history of the American Civil War
Cotton industry in the United States